Ronald Allen Carpenter, Jr. (born January 20, 1970) is a former professional American football player who played defensive back for five seasons for the Cincinnati Bengals, Minnesota Vikings. New York Jets, and St. Louis Rams. He played college football at Miami University in Oxford, Ohio, where he was a three-time first-team All-Mid-American Conference player and served as captain his senior season. He was voted to the Miami University All-Millennium team by The Cincinnati Enquirer in 2000. He was also inducted into the Miami University Athletic Hall of Fame on October 14, 2016. Carpenter was also an All-World League player for the Amsterdam Admirals and spent seasons with the New York CityHawks of the Arena Football League (AFL), the Los Angeles Xtreme of the XFL, and the Nashville Kats, Georgia Force, and Detroit Fury of the AFL. He owns a Super Bowl ring from the 1999 Rams and an XFL Championship ring from the 2001 Xtreme. Following his professional career, Carpenter took up coaching and scouting, having scouted for Pro Football Scouts Inc., the Tennessee Titans as a scouting intern, and coached for Princeton High School in Ohio, the Georgia Force, Central State University, Indiana University, Miami University and the University of Central Arkansas.

External links
Just Sports Stats

1970 births
Living people
American football defensive backs
Amsterdam Admirals players
Cincinnati Bengals players
Miami RedHawks football coaches
Miami RedHawks football players
Minnesota Vikings players
New York Jets players
St. Louis Rams players
New York CityHawks players
Nashville Kats players
Georgia Force players
Detroit Fury players
High school football coaches in Ohio
Central State Marauders football coaches
Indiana Hoosiers football coaches
Central Arkansas Bears football coaches
Los Angeles Xtreme players